Alan F Inns (born 28 August 1945) is a British rowing cox. He competed at the 1972 Summer Olympics, 1980 Summer Olympics and the 1984 Summer Olympics. He won the coxed pairs title with Michael Hart and David Maxwell and the eights title, at the 1972 National Rowing Championships.

References

External links
 

1945 births
Living people
British male rowers
Olympic rowers of Great Britain
Rowers at the 1972 Summer Olympics
Rowers at the 1980 Summer Olympics
Rowers at the 1984 Summer Olympics
Rowers from Greater London
Coxswains (rowing)